The 2019 Nigerian Senate election in Kano State held on February 23, 2019, to elect members of the Nigerian Senate to represent Kano State. Ibrahim Shekarau representing Kano Central, Jibrin I Barau representing Kano North and Kabiru Ibrahim Gaya representing Kano south all won on the platform of All Progressives Congress.

Overview

Summary

Results

Kano Central 
A total of 30 candidates registered with the Independent National Electoral Commission to contest in the election. APC candidate Ibrahim Shekarau won the election, defeating PDP candidate Madaki Aliyu Sani and 28 other party candidates. Shekarau received 61.60% of the votes, while Aliyu Sani received 33.68%

Kano North 
A total of 28 candidates registered with the Independent National Electoral Commission to contest in the election. APC candidate Jibrin I Barau won the election, defeating PDP candidate Ahmed Garba Bichi and 26 other party candidates. Barau received 61.37% of the votes, while Garba Bichi received 33.35%

Kano South 
A total of 28 candidates registered with the Independent National Electoral Commission to contest in the election. APC candidate  Kabiru Ibrahim Gaya won the election, defeating PDP candidate Abdullahi Sani Rogo and 26 other party candidates. Gaya received 55.39% of the votes, while Rogo received 37.77%

References 

Kano State senatorial elections
Kano State Senate elections